Tĩnh Túc is a township of Nguyên Bình District, Cao Bằng Province, Vietnam.

References

Populated places in Cao Bằng province
Townships in Vietnam